The Abruzzo regional election of 2000 took place on 16 April 2000.

Giovanni Pace (National Alliance) was narrowly elected President, defeating incumbent Antonio Falconio (Democrats of the Left).

Results

Source: Ministry of the Interior

2000 elections in Italy
Elections in Abruzzo
April 2000 events in Europe